Edward Cuthbert Platt (February 14, 1916 – March 19, 1974) was an American actor best known for his portrayal of the Chief in the 1965–1970 NBC/CBS television series: Get Smart. With his deep voice and mature appearance, he played an eclectic mix of characters over the span of his career.

Early life and military service
Platt was born in Staten Island, New York. He spent a part of his childhood in Kentucky and upstate New York, where he attended the Northwood School, a private school in Lake Placid, and was a member of the ski jump team. He also studied at the Juilliard School. He attended Princeton University, but left after his freshman year. He served in the United States Army during World War II.

Acting career
An operatically trained bass-baritone with a powerful voice, he debuted on Broadway in the Rodgers and Hammerstein musical Allegro. José Ferrer, who performed with Platt in the Broadway play The Shrike, helped him land his first film role in the 1955 film version. Also in 1955, Platt appeared in Rebel Without a Cause starring James Dean, Natalie Wood and Sal Mineo. He returned to Broadway in 1958 with the musical Oh, Captain!, in a romantic role. In 1959, he played Cary Grant's attorney in North by Northwest, and he starred in the movie The Rebel Set.

Platt also appeared in episodes of the original Perry Mason ("The Case of the Slandered Submarine" and "The Case of the Larcenous Lady"); 77 Sunset Strip, Trackdown, State Trooper (in the episode "Who Killed Doc Robbins"), Men into Space ("From Another World"), Ripcord ("Million Dollar Drop"), Gunsmoke, Bonanza, One Step Beyond, The Rifleman, Rawhide, Whispering Smith, The Outer Limits ("The Man with the Power" and "Keeper of the Purple Twilight"), The Dick Van Dyke Show ("A Nice Friendly Game Of Cards"), Voyage to the Bottom of the Sea, Bat Masterson (in the 1959  episode "Incident in Leadville"), Tales of Wells Fargo, The Twilight Zone, and Wagon Train

His most famous role was the regular role of The Chief in the espionage parody television series Get Smart (1965–1970). After it ended, he had a recurring role in the situation comedy series The Governor & J.J. in 1970. He had guest roles in several other television series of the era, mostly comedies, including Temperatures Rising, Bewitched, Owen Marshall: Counselor at Law, Love, American Style, and The Odd Couple as Oscar Madison's boss in the episode "Oscar's New Life".

Platt appeared as Sotto Voce in the 1969 KCET television reading of Norman Corwin's 1938 radio play The Plot to Overthrow Christmas.

Work as producer
In 1973, Platt raised the money to produce one of the first independent feature films shot entirely on videotape: Santee, starring Glenn Ford. His crew shot the production with electronic TV cameras and portable video tape recorders, then had the images transferred to film for theatrical release. The movie was not commercially successful.

Death
On March 19, 1974, Platt was found dead in his Santa Monica apartment, at the age of 58. Initial reports indicated the cause of death was a heart attack, but Platt's son later said that his father died from suicide, after a long struggle with untreated depression.

Filmography

Television credits

Notes

References

External links

 
 
 "Chief" places 6th on Great Secondary TV Characters list

1916 births
1974 suicides
American male film actors
American male television actors
Male actors from New York City
Military personnel from New York City
People from Staten Island
United States Army soldiers
Princeton University alumni
Juilliard School alumni
American bass-baritones
Singers from New York City
20th-century American male actors
20th-century American singers
20th-century American male singers
United States Army personnel of World War II
1974 deaths